The Major Indoor Soccer League, known in its final two seasons as the Major Soccer League, was an indoor soccer league in the United States that played matches from fall 1978 to spring 1992.

Local broadcasters

Notes
In their inaugural season, the Los Angeles Lazers games were broadcast on Cable Radio Network. Beginning in the second season, Bill MacDonald asked Jerry Buss and Ron Weinstein for permission to broadcast the Lazers home games on KBOB radio in Pasadena. MacDonald's family agreed to purchase the air time, and MacDonald's long running career was launched. During the 1983–84 season, the Lazers made the first entree into the television arena by broadcasting a few games on the Lakers and Kings KCAL 9 television network. Chick Hearn, the Lakers broadcaster, and Bob Miller, the Kings broadcaster, shared the play-by-play responsibilities. During the 1984–85 season, the Lazers began to broadcast their games on Prime Ticket, which was the regional sports network created by Dr. Jerry Buss for Southern California. This first Lazers broadcast was only the second event to have ever been aired on the Prime Ticket Network. Joel Meyers, a new and upcoming telecaster, joined MacDonald to become the team that announced every play from then on for the Lazers.
The Wichita Wings would appear nationally on the USA Network, ESPN, and CBS. Their first local television contract was with KSN-TV (NBC) and announcer Dave Armstrong in 1981-82. KSN would continue to broadcast the Wings through the 1985-86 season. Other announcers included Craig Bolerjack, Mike Kennedy, and Steve Dennis. Former Wing Joe Howarth and Director of Media Relations Steve Shaad, respectively, would serve as the color commentator for several of those seasons. The 1986-87 season saw KAKE-TV (ABC) take over the broadcast. Mark Allan would be their announcer through the 1988-89 season. The Wings would have no television contract thereafter. KFH Radio (1330 AM) would broadcast the Wings from 1981 through 1986, with first Bruce Haertl and then Jim Hawley announcing. Steve Shaad, Blake Schreck, and Klaus Kollmai served as color commentators on the KFH broadcasts. In 1986, KRZ (1240 AM) took over the radio broadcasting, with Dave Phillips as announcer. As KNSS, they would continue to broadcast the Wings through the 1989-90 season. Phillips would be the voice of the Wings with KZSN (1480 AM) through the 1993 season. Steve Dennis took over KZSN's announcing duties in 1994 and continued through the transition to KFH in 1995-96. Former Wings goalkeeper Kris Peat served as announcer in 1996-97. In 1997, Rob Barzegar and KQAM (1480 AM) became the Wings radio broadcaster.

National broadcasters

The MISL made inroads on national television in 1982–83. While the spring would see the end of the league's two-year deal with the USA Network, CBS would broadcast a playoff game live from Cleveland on May 7 that drew an estimated four million viewers. One game during the 1983–84 season was televised on CBS (Game 3 of the championship series on June 2) as well.

1984–85 would be the final year the MISL would have games aired on network television, CBS broadcast Game 4 of the championship series live on May 25.

For the 1985–86 season, there was a steady national TV contract for the first time since 1983, as ESPN would televise 15 regular-season games and assorted playoff games.

References

External links
The MISL: A Look Back

 
USA Network Sports
CBS Sports
ESPN announcers
SportsChannel
Hughes Television Network
Lists of association football broadcasters